The Kalay clashes are a series of clashes between the Tatmadaw and armed protestors in the town of Kalay and villages surrounding it in Kale Township during the 2021–2022 anti-coup insurgency in Myanmar. The conflict in the township has become one of the first instances of armed resistance to the military of Myanmar apart from actions by Ethnic Armed Organizations during the recent unrest in the country following the February coup.

Background 

The first instances of armed resistance to the military crackdowns on protests in the area were reported on 28 March. Protesters armed with weapons such as homemade hunting rifles have set up strongholds in parts of Kalay and engaged in battles with the Tatmadaw, who stormed these strongholds on several occasions. In addition, armed villagers have ambushed and attacked Tatmadaw soldiers and policeman en route to the city in support of the protesters. Dozens of protesters, soldiers and policeman have been killed overall since 28 March.

Clashes 
On 28 March 2021, the Tatmadaw stormed the Tarhan protest camp, one of the protesters strongholds in Kalay. Armed protesters clashed with the Tatmadaw in the city with homemade hunting rifles while villagers attacked soldiers outside the village. The protesters were forced to withdraw and the protest camp was destroyed by the Tatmadaw that night. 4 armed protesters and four soldiers were reportedly killed during the clashes, with 17 soldiers additionally injured.

Between 30 March and April, villagers around Kale township ambushed Tatmadaw reinforcements on the way to Kalay in an offensive which lead to the deaths of 5 villagers. 11 protesters were killed in Kalay as well, without information about clashes. The protest camp was rebuilt and protests continued.

On 31 March a villager was shot in the head and killed by security forces in Natchaung, while four police officers were captured by armed protesters in Kalay the same day, allegedly attempting to scout the protesters' positions. Around some time, the protesters in Kalay organized themselves into the "Kalay Civil Army." The captured police officers were later handed back over to the Tatmadaw in exchange for the release of 9 civilians who were detained by the military from the town. This the first such deal that took place during the 2021 protests.

In the early morning hours of 7 April, the Tatamadaw carried out another assault on protests strongholds in Kalay for the second time. Security forces stormed the Tarhan camp from multiple directions, armed with machine guns and grenades. Security forces sent to remove barricades opened fire on protesters. Kalay Civil Army fighters clashed with security forces, while 45 minutes into the battle Tatmadaw soldiers cut off Tarhan from reinforcements attempting to bolster the camp's defenders. 11 protesters were reportedly killed, with 10 injured in the clashes.  while an arrest campaign took place in the town. Protesters nevertheless took to the streets hours later.

See also
2021 Myanmar coup d'état
Timeline of the 2021–2022 Myanmar protests
People's Defence Force – Kalay

References

2021 in Myanmar
2021 protests
April 2021 events in Asia
Conflicts in 2021
March 2021 events in Asia
Massacres in Myanmar
Mass murder in 2021
Conflicts in 2022
Protests in Myanmar